The Educational Theatre Association (abbreviated as EdTA), founded in 1929, is the professional association for theatre education. EdTA is a national nonprofit organization with approximately 135,000 student and professional members. EdTA's mission is shaping lives through theatre education by: honoring student achievement in theatre and enriching their theatre education experience; supporting teachers by providing professional development, networking opportunities, resources, and recognition; and influencing public opinion that theatre education is essential and builds life skills.

As the professional association for theatre educators, EdTA operates the International Thespian Society (ITS), an honorary organization that has inducted more than 2.3 million high school and middle school theatre students. ITS honors student achievement, provides leadership opportunities, and provides access to resources beyond the student's own school including awards and scholarships.

EdTA publishes Dramatics, a magazine for high school theatre students, and Teaching Theatre, a journal for theatre education professionals. Meetings include an annual conference for theatre teachers and a massive week-long International Thespian Festival. Currently, the event is held at the University of Nebraska in Lincoln. This celebration of theatre hosts over 4,000 students and their teachers from theatre programs throughout the world.

External links
 Official EdTA website
 Official EdTA FAQ
 Official ITS website
 Official International Thespian Festival website

Theatrical organizations in the United States
Theatrical organizations in Canada